Charles Ezra Greene (1842–1903) was an American civil engineer, born in Cambridge, Massachusetts.

He graduated at Harvard in 1862 and at Massachusetts Institute of Technology in 1863, served as quartermaster during the last two years of the Civil War, and was United States assistant engineer from 1870 to 1872, when, for part of a year, he was city engineer of Bangor, Maine.

In the same year he became connected with the engineering department of the University of Michigan.  In 1895, he became the first dean of the University of Michigan College of Engineering, a position he held until his death.

He was an associate editor of the Engineering News from 1876 - 1877.  his publications include:  
 Graphical Method for the Analysis of Bridge Trusses (1876)  
 Trusses and Arches: Graphics for Engineers, Architects, and Builders (three volumes, 1876–79; third edition, 1903)  
 Notes on Rankine's Civil Engineering (1891)  
 Structural Mechanics (1897; second edition, 1905)

See also

References

1842 births
1903 deaths
American engineering writers
American civil engineers
Harvard College alumni
Massachusetts Institute of Technology alumni
People from Boston
Union Army officers
University of Michigan faculty
Quartermasters
Military personnel from Massachusetts